Hotsimsk District (Khotimsky raion) is a raion (district) in Mogilev Region, Belarus, the administrative center is the urban-type settlement of Khotsimsk. As of 2009, its population was 13,057. Population of Khotsimsk accounts for 54.3% of the district's population. Khotimsk Raion is the easternmost district of the country. The extreme eastern point of Belarus lies to the East of Hotimsk urban-type settlement.

References

 
Districts of Mogilev Region